Ninel Vasilyevna Krutova (later Bezzabotnova; ; born 3 January 1926) is a Russian retired diver. She competed at the 1952, 1956 and 1960 Summer Olympics.

Biography
Krutova competed for the Dynamo Moscow club from 1943 and was nine times National Champion in the platform events and four times Springboard champion, she competed for her country for eight years from 1952. Krutova made her Olympic debut when she was 25 years old at the 1952 Summer Olympics, where she finished in fourth place in the 3 metre springboard and 14th in the 10 metre platform, four years later she was competing in the 1956 Summer Olympics, and in her only event the 3 metre springboard she finished in 10th place. Rome was the setting for the 1960 Summer Olympics, and in her third Olympics she was the bronze medal in the 10 metre platform, and also finished in fifth place in the 3 metre springboard even though she went in to the final round in second place.

Before he success at the 1960 Olympics, Krutova won the gold medal at the 1958 European Aquatics Championships in the springboard event, and then followed it up with a silver medal four years later at the 1962 European Aquatics Championships.

In 1964 Krutova started coaching for the Dynamo team then at the turn of the century she was coach the Russia Veterans Sports Team. Krutova has also been awarded the Order of the Badge of Honour.

References

External links
Article on Ninel Krutova's 90th birthday 

1926 births
Living people
Russian female divers
Olympic divers of the Soviet Union
Divers at the 1952 Summer Olympics
Divers at the 1956 Summer Olympics
Divers at the 1960 Summer Olympics
Olympic bronze medalists for the Soviet Union
Olympic medalists in diving
Medalists at the 1960 Summer Olympics